Potok Górny  is a village in Biłgoraj County, Lublin Voivodeship, in eastern Poland. It is the seat of the gmina (administrative district) called Gmina Potok Górny.

The village has a population of 1,341.

References

Villages in Biłgoraj County
Kholm Governorate